Edward Griffiths (1929–1995) was a British Labour politician.

Edward Griffiths may also refer to:

Edward Griffiths (cricketer) (1862–1893), English cricketer
Eddie Griffiths (1891–1980), Australian fire fighter
Eddie Griffiths (Hollyoaks)

See also
Edward Griffith (disambiguation)